Manifiesto is the ninth solo studio album from Chilean songwriter Víctor Jara. It was edited after his death, using as a base the songs written for the album Tiempos que cambian (Times that change), that was left unfinished.

In the album, the Chilean group Inti-Illimani and the Chilean musician Patricio Castillo participate. Patricio Castillo belonged, until 1971, to Quilapayún, another famous Chilean band, which he re-entered definitively several years later. Most of the songs were composed by Víctor Jara, with the exception of «Aquí me quedo» (Here I stay), composed with Patricio Castillo.

Versions 
This album has several editions, with different covers, name changes and addition of songs. The original cover of Tiempos que cambian (Times that change), included a photograph of Víctor Jara in black and white, in profile, looking to the right. That image was later used in 2001, by WEA Chile, for the edition of the Antología musical (Musical anthology). For the edition of Manifiesto from 2001, made by WEA Chile, and image of Víctor Jara, with poncho and with a stone behind was used.

Track listing

Credits 
2001 Re-edition:
 Patricio Castillo: canciones 1 a 3, 5
 Inti-Illimani: canción 4
 Carlos Esteban Fonseca: adaptation and design
 Joaquín García: masterization
 Patricio Guzmán, Antonio Larrea: photography

References

1974 albums
Víctor Jara albums
Warner Music Group albums